The 2006 North Carolina Senate election was held on November 7, 2006 to elect members to all fifty seats in the North Carolina Senate. The election coincided with the elections for other offices including the U.S House of Representatives and state house. The primary election was held on May 2, 2006 with primary run-offs occurring on May 30, 2006 and September 12, 2006. The Democratic Party made a net gain of 2 seats in the state senate.

Results Summary

Incumbents defeated in primary election
John Garwood (R-District 45), defeated by David Blust (R)

Incumbents defeated in general election
C.W. "Pete" Bland (D-District 2), defeated by Jean Preston (R)
Hugh Webster (R-District 24), defeated by Anthony "Tony" Foriest (D)
Keith Presnell (R-District 47), defeated by Joe Sam Queen (D)

Open seats that changed parties
John Garwood (R-District 45) lost re-nomination, seat won by Steve Goss (D)

Detailed Results

Districts 1-25

District 1
Incumbent Democrat President Pro Tempore Marc Basnight has represented the 1st district since 1985.

District 2
Incumbent Democrat C.W. “Pete” Bland has represented the 2nd district since his appointment in 2006. He lost re-election to Republican Jean Preston.

District 3
Incumbent Democrat Clark Jenkins has represented the 3rd district since 2003.

District 4
Incumbent Democrat Robert Holloman has represented the 4th district since 2003.

District 5
Incumbent Democrat John Kerr has represented the 5th district and its predecessors since 1993.

District 6
Incumbent Republican Harry Brown has represented the 6th district since 2005.

District 7
Incumbent Democrat Doug Berger has represented the 7th district since 2005.

District 8
Incumbent Democrat R. C. Soles Jr. has represented the 8th district and its predecessors since 1977.

District 9
Incumbent Democrat Julia Boseman has represented the 9th district since 2005.

District 10
Incumbent Democrat Charles Albertson has represented the 10th district and its predecessors since 1993.

District 11
Incumbent Democrat A.B. Swindell has represented the 11th district and its predecessors since 2001.

District 12
Incumbent Republican Fred Smith has represented the 12th district since 2003.

District 13
Incumbent Democrat David Weinstein has represented the 13th district and its predecessors since 1997.

District 14
incumbent Democrat Vernon Malone has represented the 14th district since 2003.

District 15
Incumbent Republican Neal Hunt has represented the 15th district since 2005.

District 16
Incumbent Democrat Janet Cowell has represented the 16th district since 2005.

District 17
Incumbent Republican Richard Stevens has represented the 17th district since 2003.

District 18
Incumbent Democrat Bob Atwater has represented the 18th district since 2005.

District 19
Incumbent Democratic Majority Leader Tony Rand has represented the 19th district and its predecessors since 1995.

District 20
Incumbent Democrat Jeanne Lucas has represented the 20th district and its predecessors since 1993.

District 21
Incumbent Democrat Larry Shaw has represented the 21st district and its predecessors since 1995.

District 22
Incumbent Republican Harris Blake has represented the 22nd district since 2003.

District 23
Incumbent Democrat Eleanor Kinnaird has represented the 23rd district and its predecessors since 1997.

District 24
Incumbent Republican Hugh Webster has represented the 24th district since 1995. Webster lost re-election to Democrat Anthony "Tony" Foriest.

District 25
Incumbent Democrat Bill Purcell has represented the 25th district and its predecessors since 1997.

Districts 26-50

District 26
Incumbent Republican Minority Leader Phil Berger has represented the 26th district since and its predecessors since 2001.

District 27
Incumbent Democrat Kay Hagan has represented the 27th district and its predecessors since 1999.

District 28
Incumbent Democrat Katie Dorsett has represented the 28th district since 2003.

District 29
Incumbent Republican Jerry Tillman has represented the 29th district since 2003.

District 30
Incumbent Republican Don East has represented the 30th district since 2005.

District 31
Incumbent Republican Pete Brunstetter has represented the 31st district since his appointment in 2006, he was elected to a full term.

District 32
Incumbent Democrat Linda Garrou has represented the 32nd district and its predecessors since 1999.

District 33
Incumbent Republican Stan Bingham has represented the 33rd district and its predecessors since 2001.

District 34
Incumbent Republican Andrew Brock has represented the 34th district since 2003.

District 35
Incumbent Republican Eddie Goodall has represented the 35th district since 2005.

District 36
Incumbent Republican Fletcher Hartsell Jr. has represented the 36th district and its predecessors since 1991.

District 37
Incumbent Democrat Dan Clodfelter has represented the 37th district and its predecessors since 1999.

District 38
Incumbent Democrat Charlie Dannelly has represented the 38th district and its predecessors since 1995.

District 39
Incumbent Republican Robert Pittenger has represented the 39th district and its predecessors since 2003.

District 40
Incumbent Democrat Maclom Graham has represented the 40th district since 2005.

District 41
Incumbent Republican James Forrester has represented the 41st district and its predecessors since 1991.

District 42
Incumbent Republican Austin Allran has represented the 42nd district and its predecessors since 1987.

District 43
Incumbent Democrat David Hoyle has represented the 43rd district and its predecessors since 1993.

District 44
Incumbent Republican Jim Jacumin has represented the 44th district since 2005.

District 45
Incumbent Republican John Garwood has represented the 45th district since 1997. Garwood lost re-nomination to fellow Republican David Blust. Blust was defeated by Democrat Steve Goss.

District 46
Incumbent Democrat Walter Dalton has represented the 46th district and its predecessors since 1997.

District 47
Incumbent Republican Keith Presnell has represented the 47th District since 2005. In a rematch of the 2004 election he lost re-election to Democrat Joe Sam Queen, who had previously represented the 47th district from 2003 to 2005.

District 48
Incumbent Republican Tom Apodaca has represented the 48th district since 2003.

District 49
Incumbent Democrat Martin Nesbitt has represented the 49th district since 2004.

District 50
Incumbent Democrat John Snow has represented the 50th district since 2005.

References

2006
2006 state legislature elections in the United States
Senate, North Carolina